The 1927 New South Wales state election was for 90 electoral districts returning 90 members and all elections were held on 8 October 1927.

This election took place after the Hare-Clark voting system was abolished and replaced with single member districts with optional preferential voting.

Results by electoral district

Albury

Alexandria

Annandale

Armidale

Ashburnham

Ashfield

Auburn

Balmain

Bankstown

Barwon

Bathurst

Bondi 

Both Harold Jaques and Millicent Preston-Stanley were Nationalist members for Eastern Suburbs and Preston-Stanley won Nationalist pre-selection. Jaques re-joined the Nationalist party after the election.

Botany

Burwood

Byron

Canterbury

Castlereagh

Cessnock

Clarence

Coogee

Cootamundra

Corowa

Croydon

Drummoyne

Dulwich Hill

Eastwood

Enmore

Glebe

Gloucester

Gordon

Goulburn

Granville

Hamilton

Hartley

Hawkesbury

Hornsby

Hurstville

Illawarra

Kahibah

King

Kurri Kurri

Lachlan

Lakemba

Lane Cove

Leichhardt

Lismore

Liverpool Plains

Maitland

Manly

Marrickville

Monaro

Mosman

Mudgee

Murray

Murrumbidgee

Namoi

Nepean

Neutral Bay

Newcastle

Newtown

North Sydney

Oatley

Orange

Oxley

Paddington

Parramatta

Phillip

Raleigh

Randwick

Redfern

Rockdale

Rozelle

Ryde

St George

South Coast

Sturt

Surry Hills

Tamworth

Temora

Tenterfield

Upper Hunter

Vaucluse

Wagga Wagga

Wallsend

Waverley

Willoughby

Wollondilly

Wollongong

Woollahra

Young 

<noinclude>

See also 
 Candidates of the 1927 New South Wales state election
 Members of the New South Wales Legislative Assembly, 1927–1930

Notes

References 

1927